David Wikander (21 July 1884 – 15 November 1955), was a Swedish musicologist, organist and composer.

Born in Säfsnäs parish in Dalarna, Wikander was organist at Stockholm's Storkyrkan. He arranged many traditional songs of the Dalarna region.

Wikander died in Stockholm at the age of 71.

Works, editions, recordings
Choral:
 Dofta, dofta, vit syrén (text: Emil Kléen) Scent, scent, white lilac
 Kung Liljekonvalje (text: Gustav Fröding) King Lily of the valley
 Förvårskväll (text: Ragnar Jändel)* Spring evening

References

1884 births
1955 deaths
Swedish composers
Swedish male composers
20th-century Swedish male musicians